Kelvin Batey (born 9 May 1981 from Market Warsop, Nottinghamshire) is a British born professional "Mid/Current School" Bicycle Motocross (BMX) racer who competed for Great Britain from the start of his career until 2008 and then for Ireland.

Racing career milestones

Note: Professional first are on the national level unless otherwise indicated.

Started racing: Early 1988 age 6 at a track in Warsop, England

Sanctioning body:

First race result: 1st

First win (local):

First sponsor: Invert Magazine

First national win: 1st

Turned Professional: 1997 age 16 in England

First Professional race result: 6th place - Coppull National May 1997

First Professional win: In Mansfield, England in August 1999.

First Junior Pro* win: Holland European Round - Junior Men 1998

First Senior Pro** race result:

First Senior Pro win:

Retired: Active

Height & weight at height of his career (1999–2015): Ht:6'2" Wt:197 lbs.

*In the NBL it is B"/Superclass/"A" pro (beginning with 2000 season); in the ABA it is "A" pro.
**In the NBL it is "A" pro (Elite men); in the ABA it is "AA" pro.

Career factory and major bike shop sponsors

Note: This listing only denotes the racer's primary sponsors. At any given time a racer could have numerous ever-changing co-sponsors. Primary sponsorships can be verified by BMX press coverage and sponsor's advertisements at the time in question. When possible exact dates are used.

Amateur
Invert Magazine: 1989–1990
Wulfsport: 1990–1992
Dyno: 1993
GT (Gary Turner) Bicycles (UK Division): 1994–1995
Giant Bicycles: 1996
GT Bicycles (Europe Division): 1996-December 1999. Batey would turn pro with this sponsor.

Professional
GT Bicycles (Europe Division): 1996-December 1999
Haro Bicycles (UK Division): January 2000-February 2002
One Bicycles European Team: January 2003-December 2005
Intense BMX World Team: 21 December 2005 – 31 December 2006
Free Agent All-Star World Team: 1 January 2007 – 31 December 2010
 Intense Route 55 1 January 2011 – 31 December 2013
GET Racing 1 January 2014 – present

Career bicycle motocross titles

Note: Listed are District, State/Provincial/Department, Regional, National, and International titles in italics. Depending on point totals of individual racers, winners of Grand Nationals do not necessarily win National titles. Only sanctioning bodies active during the racer's career are listed.

Amateur/Junior
British Cycling Bicycle Motocross (BCBMX)(England):

National Bicycle League (NBL)
None
American Bicycle Association (ABA)
None
International Bicycle Motocross Federation (IBMXF)*

Fédération Internationale Amateur de Cyclisme (FIAC)*

Union Cycliste Internationale (UCI)*

*See note in professional section

Professional/Eite Men

British Cycling Bicycle Motocross (BCBMX)(England):
2000 Elite Cruiser National Champion
2001 Elite Men National Champion
2001 Elite Cruiser National Champion
2003 Elite Men National Champion
2003 Elite Men British Champion
2003 Elite Men No Clips Champion2004 Elite Men National Champion2004 Elite Men No Clips Champion
2005 Elite Men National Champion
2005 Elite Men British Champion
2006 Elite Men British Champion
2007 Elite Men British Champion
2008 Elite Men British Champion
2009 Elite Men National Champion
2009 Elite Men British Champion
2009 Elite Men National Champion
2010 Elite Men British Champion
National Bicycle League (NBL)

American Bicycle Association (ABA)

International Bicycle Motocross Federation (IBMXF)*
None
Fédération Internationale Amateur de Cyclisme (FIAC)*
None
Union Cycliste Internationale (UCI)*
1998 Junior Men European Elite/Junior Champion
1999 Junior Men World Bronze Medalist
2005 Elite Men Cruiser Silver Medalist
2006 Elite Men Cruiser Bronze Medalist
2007 Elite Men Cruiser Bronze Medalist
2013 Masters World Champion
2014 Masters World Silver Medalist
"2015 Masters World Champion"

*Note: Beginning in 1991 the IBMXF and FIAC, the amateur cycling arm of the UCI, had been holding joint World Championship events as a transitional phase in merging which began in earnest in 1993. Beginning with the 1996 season the IBMXF and FIAC completed the merger and both ceased to exist as independent entities being integrated into the UCI. Beginning with the 1996 World Championships held in Brighton, England the UCI would officially hold and sanction BMX World Championships and with it inherited all precedents, records, streaks, etc. from both the IBMXF and FIAC.

Pro Series Championships

Notable accolades

British Cycling BMX Rider of the Year 1999

South Yorkshire Sports Personality of the Year 2007

BBC North Male Sports Personality of the Year 2007 runner up

Lifetime achievement award with Cycling Ireland. November 2014

Significant injuries
Broken CollarBone at 1997 World Championships, Australia
Suffered a compound fracture of the femur on 24 May 2002 at the Bike 2002 in Birmingham, England. He fell at the back end of a jump and then a competitor, Steve Peat, cleared the jump but landed on Batey. Was laid up until late summer 2002.
Broken and dislocated wrist July 2001 - out for 6 months
Broken hands suffered at World Supercross Cup - out for 3 months
Concussion, broken hand and broken ribs at GB Olympic trials 2008
Rotator cuff surgery on shoulder 2008
Torn posterior cruciate ligament in the knee - August 2015 after falling 20 feet over a pro section while going for a national title at the final round of the series at Birmingham.

All out racer who leaves everything he has on the track. Has fought through numerous injuries before, during and after races to make sure he is up on the gate for a big race meeting. Balls out but fair style wins him a lot of respect from the race fans and fellow racers.

Miscellaneous
Worked at Winterhill School in Rotherham as a PE Teacher.

Working closely with Cycling Ireland and BMX Ireland in promoting the sport in the country.

Brother Liam is a well known poker player who also used to be a top BMX rider in Gb

Post BMX career
 After his bmx career he became a physical education teacher Winterhill school in Rotherham

BMX press magazine interviews and articles

BMX magazine covers

Note: Only magazines that were in publication at the time of the racer's career(s) are listed unless specifically noted.

Fastlane BMX Mag Issue 1

Minicycle/BMX Action & Super BMX:
None
Bicycle Motocross Action & Go:
None
BMX Plus!:

Snap BMX Magazine & Transworld BMX:
None

Moto Mag:

Bicycles Today & BMX Today (The official NBL publication under two names):

ABA Action, American BMXer, BMXer (The official ABA publication under three names):

Notes

External links
 
 
 The American Bicycle Association (ABA) Website.
 The National Bicycle League (NBL) Website.
 Redditch premiers.co.uk interview.
 2 March 2006 BMX Talk Rider Interview.

1981 births
Living people
English male cyclists
Irish male cyclists
BMX riders
People from Warsop
Sportspeople from Nottinghamshire